The phonology of the Ojibwe language (also Ojibwa, Ojibway, or Chippewa, and most commonly referred to in the language as Anishinaabemowin) varies from dialect to dialect, but all varieties share common features. Ojibwe is an indigenous language of the Algonquian language family spoken in Canada and the United States in the areas surrounding the Great Lakes, and westward onto the northern plains in both countries, as well as in northeastern Ontario and northwestern Quebec. The article on Ojibwe dialects discusses linguistic variation in more detail, and contains links to separate articles on each dialect. There is no standard language and no dialect that is accepted as representing a standard.  Ojibwe words in this article are written in the practical orthography commonly known as  the Double vowel system.

Ojibwe dialects have the same phonological inventory of vowels and consonants with minor variations, but some dialects differ considerably along a number of phonological parameters. For example, the Ottawa and Eastern Ojibwe dialects have changed relative to other dialects by adding a process of vowel syncope that deletes short vowels in specified positions within a word.

This article primarily uses examples from the Southwestern Ojibwe dialect spoken in Minnesota and Wisconsin, sometimes also known as Ojibwemowin.

Phonemes
Ojibwe dialects tend to have 29 phonemes: 11 vowels (seven oral and four nasal) and 18 consonants.

Vowels
All dialects of Ojibwe have seven oral vowels. Vowel length is phonologically contrastive, hence phonemic. Although the long and short vowels are phonetically distinguished by vowel quality, recognition of vowel length in phonological representations is required, as the distinction between long and short vowels  is essential for the operation of the metrical rule of vowel syncope that characterizes the Ottawa and Eastern Ojibwe dialects, as well as for the rules that determine word stress. There are three short vowels, ; and three corresponding long vowels, in addition to a fourth long vowel , which lacks a corresponding short vowel.

but more generally as

Ojibwe has a series of three short oral vowels and four long ones. The two series are characterized by both length and quality differences.

Ojibwe has nasal vowels; some arise predictably by rule in all analyses, and other long nasal vowels are of uncertain phonological status.

They most commonly occur in the final syllable of nouns with diminutive suffixes or words with a diminutive connotation. In the Ottawa dialect long nasal  occurs as well as in the suffix  ([-() marking the first person (conjunct) animate intransitive.

Other discussions of the issue in Ottawa are silent on the issue.

A study of the Southwestern Ojibwe (Chippewa) dialect spoken in Minnesota describes the status of the analogous vowels as unclear, noting that while the distribution of the long nasal vowels is restricted, there is a minimal pair distinguished only by the nasality of the vowel: giiwe  ('he goes home') and giiwenh  ('so the story goes').

Nasalized allophones of the short vowels also exist. The nasal allophones of oral vowels are derived from a short vowel followed by a nasal+fricative cluster (for example, imbanz, 'I'm singed') is ). For many speakers, the nasal allophones appear not only before nasal+fricative clusters, but also before all fricatives, particularly if the vowel is preceded by another nasal. E.g., for some speakers, waabooz, ('rabbit') is pronounced , and for many, mooz, ('moose') is pronounced .

Consonants

The "voiced/voiceless" obstruent pairs of Ojibwe vary in their realization depending on the dialect. In many dialects, they are described as having a "lenis/fortis" contrast. In this analysis, all obstruents are considered voiceless. The fortis consonants are characterised by being pronounced more strongly and are longer in duration. They often are aspirated or preaspirated. The lenis consonants are often voiced, especially between vowels, although they often tend to be voiceless at the end of words. They are pronounced less strongly and are shorter in duration, compared to the fortis ones. In some communities, the lenis/fortis distinction has been replaced with a pure voiced/voiceless one.

This means that, for example, Southwestern Ojibwe wazhashk, ('muskrat') is pronounced the same as wazask in some dialects of Saulteaux.

 before velars becomes .

Phonotactics

Ojibwe in general permits relatively few consonant clusters, and most are only found word-medially. The permissible ones are -sk-, -shp-, -sht-, -shk- (which can also appear word-finally), -mb-, -nd- (which can also appear word-finally),-ng- (also word-finally), -nj- (also word-finally), -nz-, -nzh- (also word-finally) and -ns- (also word-finally). Furthermore, any consonant (except w, h, or y) and some clusters can be followed by w (although not word-finally). Many dialects, however, permit far more clusters as a result of vowel syncope.

Prosody

Ojibwe divides words into metrical "feet." Counting from the beginning of the word, each group of two syllables constitutes a foot; the first syllable in a foot is weak, the second strong. However, long vowels and vowels in the last syllable of a word are always strong, so if they occur in the weak slot of a foot, then they form a separate one-syllable foot, and counting resumes starting with the following vowel. The final syllable of a word is always strong as well. For example, the word bebezhigooganzhii ('horse') is divided into feet as (be)(be)(zhi-goo)(gan-zhii). The strong syllables all receive at least secondary stress. The rules that determine which syllable receives the primary stress are quite complex and many words are irregular. In general, though, the strong syllable in the third foot from the end of a word receives the primary stress.

Phonological processes

A defining characteristic of several of the more eastern dialects is that they exhibit a great deal of vowel syncope, the deletion of vowels in certain positions within a word. In some dialects (primarily Odawa and Eastern Ojibwe), all unstressed vowels are lost (see above for a discussion of Ojibwe stress). In other dialects (such as some dialects of Central Ojibwe), short vowels in initial syllables are lost, but not in other unstressed syllables. For example, the word oshkinawe ('young man') of Algonquin and Southwestern Ojibwe (stress: oshkinawe) is shkinawe in some dialects of Central Ojibwe and shkinwe in Eastern Ojibwe and Odawa. Regular, pervasive syncope is a comparatively recent development, arising in the past eighty years or so.

A common morphophonemic variation occurs in some verbs whose roots end in -n. When the root is followed by certain suffixes beginning with i or when it is word-final, the root-final -n changes to -zh (e.g., -miin-, 'to give something to someone' but gimiizhim, 'you guys give it to me'). In Ojibwe linguistics, this is indicated when writing the root with the symbol  (so the root 'to give something to someone' would be written ). There are also some morphophonemic alternations where root-final -s changes to -sh (indicated with ) and where root-final -n changes to -nzh (indicated with ).

In some dialects, obstruents become voiceless/fortis after the tense preverbs gii- (marking the past) and wii- (marking the future/desiderative). In such dialects, for example, gii-baapi ('s/he laughed') becomes  (often spelled gii-paapi).

Historical phonology

In the evolution from Proto-Algonquian to Ojibwe, the most sweeping change was the voicing of all Proto-Algonquian voiceless obstruents except when they were in clusters with *h, *ʔ, *θ, or *s (which were subsequently lost). Proto-Algonquian *r and *θ became Ojibwe .

Some examples of the changes at work are presented in the table below:

For illustrative purposes, chart of phonological variation between different Cree dialects of Proto-Algonquian *r have been reproduced here but for the Anishinaabe languages, with the inclusion of Swampy Cree and Atikamekw for illustrative purposes only, with corresponding Cree orthography in parentheses:

See also

Anishinaabe language
Proto-Algonquian language
Glyne Piggott
Massachusett phonology

Notes

References

Further reading
Artuso, Christian. 1998. Noogom gaa-izhi-anishinaabemonaaniwag: Generational Difference in Algonquin. MA thesis, Department of Linguistics. University of Manitoba.

External links
 Rand Valentine's introduction to Ojibwe
 Grammar, lessons, and dictionaries
 Correspondences of Ojibwe and Cree Sounds
 Freelang Ojibwe Dictionary – Freeware off-line dictionary, updated with additional entries every 6–10 weeks.
 Language Geek Page on Ojibwe – Syllabary fonts and keyboard emulators are also available from this site.
 Our Languages: Nakawē (Saulteaux/Plains Ojibwe at the Saskatchewan Indian Cultural Centre)

Ojibwe culture
Anishinaabe languages
Indigenous languages of the North American eastern woodlands
Indigenous languages of the North American Subarctic
First Nations languages in Canada
Languages of the United States
Native American phonologies